Rugby league nines at the 2019 Pacific Games was played from 8–9 July 2019 at Apia Park in Samoa. A women's rugby league tournament was introduced for the first time at the Pacific Games.

Medal summary

Medal table

Results

Men's tournament

Pool A

Pool B

Ranking games

Finals

Rankings

Women's tournament

Pool A

Pool B

Finals

Rankings

See also
 Rugby league at the Pacific Games

References

 Day 1 results. International Rugby League Federation. 8 July 2019
 Day 2 results. International Rugby League Federation. 9 July 2019

2019 Pacific Games
2019
2019 in rugby league
Rugby league nines
2019 in Samoa rugby league